Sytnyk or Sytnik is a Ukrainian surname.  It may refer to:

 Artem Sytnyk, National Anti-Corruption Bureau of Ukraine director since 2015
 Kostiantyn Sytnyk (1926-2017), Ukrainian scientist
 Oleksandr Sytnik (b. 1984), Ukrainian football striker
 Oleksandr Sytnyk (b. 1985), Ukrainian football defender

See also
 

Ukrainian-language surnames